Tiny Troopers is a top-down squad-based multidirectional shooter developed by Finnish studio Kukouri Mobile Entertainment and published by Chillingo, Iceberg Interactive and Game Troopers. It was released on 24 August 2012 for PC and on 7 June 2012 for iOS. The game is available on iOS, Android, Windows, OS X and Windows Phone. The game puts you in command of a team of troopers (soldiers) which are guided through various objectives in 30 levels of increasing difficulty.

Gameplay 
Tiny Troopers uses a tapping/clicking system to move and shoot enemies and enemy buildings to complete a mission. A drag and drop mechanism is used to activate special weapons such as grenades, bazookas, and airstrikes. During each level, the player will face various challenges and will be required to complete objectives such as freeing hostages, protecting journalists, survival and eliminating enemy troops. Before starting a mission, a player may select the difficulty of that mission and purchase upgrades using Command Points and Medals. Players are also given a mission briefing stating the objective of the level and can suggest which specialist(s) to hire for the next mission. Troops that survive a level will be promoted and will subsequently become stronger, while troops that are killed will be replaced by new recruits and the Command Points gained by the fallen troop are subsequently forfeited. During a mission, the player can use the support menu to call for drop packages such as med-packs, grenades, an airborne (only after taking casualties), bazookas, airstrikes or an intel pack which reveals the location of enemies and collectibles on the map to be deployed. The player also has the opportunity to check the objectives of the mission on the map.

Command Points are a form of currency that can be obtained and accumulated by killing enemy units, enemy buildings, completing missions or picking up collectibles during gameplay. However, Command Points can also be purchased using real-world money through in-app purchases. Medals are used to unlock new training packages, which permanently increase the characteristics of your soldiers. They can be collected during gameplay by completing missions or obtained through in-app purchases using real-world money.

In Zombie mode, the objective is to survive waves of zombies. As each wave is completed, larger numbers of stronger zombies begin to spawn. The game supplies the user with medipacks and airdrops containing special weapons such as grenades, airstrikes, and bazookas. Unlocked soldiers are enclosed in barricaded areas and can be freed as the waves progress to increase the size of your squad.

Reception 

Tiny Troopers received mediocre reviews for the PC version and positive reviews for the iOS version. The PC version holds an aggregate score of 57 out of 100 on while the iOS version is given a rating of 81 out of 100  on Metacritic and 75% and 58% for the iOS and PC versions respectively on GameRankings.

Gamezebo's Al Dellinger was generally impressed by Tiny Troopers and rated the game 4.5 out of 5. However, he felt that because you can't control troops individually, one might seldom get stuck behind an obstacle. Dellinger also suggests that the humor is not for everyone, as certain moments feel too "real" for the game, like when a shot enemy is still alive on the ground asking for a mercy-kill. In conclusion, Dellinger says "this is an excellent title. It’s a blast, the controls are smooth, and the missions are unique."

Pocketgamer's Harry Slater thought " Tiny Troopers isn't interesting enough to hold your attention for very long" and rated the game 6 out of 10. He felt the game did not include enough tactical decisions and detaches yourself from feeling as if you are part of an elite squad. Both Slater and Dellinger feel that a formation option would come in handy to split the squad around enemy flanks.

GameSpot's Nathan Meunier feels the game is better suited for mobile devices and gave a mediocre rating of 5 out of 10. He mentions that the control actions on the PC are not as smooth as it is on mobile. To activate special weapons, the user has to press the Ctrl key to temporarily toggle your special weapon which makes it difficult while trying to shoot and maneuver around at the same time. However, Meunier feels positive about "the way power-ups tie directly into the scoring mechanic. Racking up kills and collecting loot earns you command points that you can spend to temporarily boost your fighting capabilities and call in reinforcements".

Tiny Troopers was downloaded over 1,000,000 on the Google Play store. On Window phones, Tiny Troopers reached over 1,000,000 downloads during the first four weeks after the launch.

References

External links 
 

2012 video games
Android (operating system) games
Chillingo games
Iceberg Interactive games
IOS games
MacOS games
Multidirectional shooters
Single-player video games
Video games developed in Finland
Windows games
Windows Phone games